Prostanthera laricoides is a species of flowering plant in the family Lamiaceae and is endemic to the inland of Western Australia. It is a small shrub with densely hairy, densely glandular branchlets, cylindrical leaves clustered near the ends of branchlets, and dull, light red flowers.

Description
Flowering occurs from August to March.

Taxonomy
Prostanthera laricoides was first formally described in 1984 by Barry Conn in the Journal of the Adelaide Botanic Gardens from specimens collected near Cundeelee in 1967.

Distribution and habitat
This mintbush sometimes grows on ridges amongst granite rocks and has been collected in the Avon Wheatbelt, Coolgardie and Great Victoria Desert biogeographic regions.

Conservation status
Prostanthera laricoides is classified as "not threatened" by the Government of Western Australia Department of Parks and Wildlife.

References

laricoides
Flora of Western Australia
Lamiales of Australia
Taxa named by Barry John Conn
Plants described in 1984